L. Orin Slagle, Jr. was the third Dean of the Florida State University College of Law, President of the Law School Admission Council, and the fourteenth Dean of the Ohio State University Moritz College of Law.

Education

Slagle earned his bachelor's degree from the Ohio State University in 1954.  He then received his law degree from the Ohio State University Moritz College of Law in 1957.

Legal career

Slagle begin his legal career at Mudge, Stern, Baldwin and Todd in New York, New York before moving to England to serve in the U.S. Air Force Judge Advocate General Corps, where he attained the rank of captain.  Slagle entered academia in 1961 when he returned to the Ohio State University Moritz College of Law, where he served as assistant professor, professor and then as associate dean. In 1968, Slagle become a partner at the Dargusch and Day law firm in Columbus, Ohio. He then returned to Ohio State to serve as the fourteenth Dean of the Moritz College of Law from 1974 to 1980.  Slagle then served as the President of the Law School Admission Council from 1978 to 1980 while continuing his full-time teaching at Moritz.  In 1980 Slagle was appointed the third Dean of the Florida State University College of Law and served in that role until 1984 when he returned to full-time teaching.

References

External links

Year of birth missing (living people)
Living people
Ohio State University alumni
Ohio State University Moritz College of Law alumni
Moritz College of Law faculty
Florida State University faculty
Deans of law schools in the United States
People from Clark County, Ohio
American legal scholars